"Deathcar" is the third single from Fightstar's second album One Day Son, This Will All Be Yours, and was released on 3 December 2007.

One of the most brutal songs on the album, it includes prolonged screaming vocals and heavy guitar work. It was inspired by a harrowing news item on Chinese human meat wagons — as well as the end of Simpson's relationship. "Deathcars are these vans the Chinese have and, if they need an organ donor for someone, then they execute death-row prisoners in the vans and bring the organs to accident victims," explains Simpson. "I heard about them on the news at the same time as I heard that my ex-girlfriend was going out with someone new. I've sort of merged him and the deathcar together. I'm driving and he's in the back...."

This audio format features a CD on one side and a vinyl on the other, building a bridge between both analog and digital audio on a single format.  Fightstar have taken the honour of releasing the first record on the VinylDisc format in the UK.  The limited edition single includes the title track, plus 3 extra exclusive tracks. "99" was recorded at the band's sold-out show at London's Koko, the two other tracks "Nerv/Seele" and "Shinji lkari" are new tracks recorded specifically for this release and both are inspired by and take their names from the classic anime Neon Genesis Evangelion.  Only 4000 copies were manufactured. Another track, "Deathcar — Live at Koko"  is available as a download exclusively for iTunes.

In 21 November's issue of Kerrang! magazine, Deathcar was voted the No. 1 track to download that week. The song also makes an appearance on the soundtrack to the 2007 fictional movie Resident Evil: Extinction.

Track listing
VinylDisc
 CD Side
 "Deathcar"
 "99" (Live) ^
 "Nerv/Seele"
 "Shinji Ikari" (unlisted track)
 Vinyl Side
 "Shinji Ikari"

Digital download
 "Deathcar"
 "Deathcar" (Live) ^

iTunes Exclusive
 "Deathcar"
 "Nerv/Seele"
 "Deathcar" (Live) ^
 "99" (Live) ^

^ Live tracks performed at Koko, London.

Video
On 21 November, the official video (which had a small budget of £500, hence the poor sound quality) was released on the band's MySpace, and debuted on the UK music channel Scuzz on 25 November. Throughout the video, paramedics can be seen trying to catch Charlie Simpson and take him to a death car. Dan, Al and Omar are the paramedics. The video also shows Omar driving the van. Portions of the video see the band with each other playing the song inside a small room. There has since been an uncut version released by the band which was 'too bloody' to be shown where they cut Charlie's heart out and it can be seen in one of the member's hands. This can be found on YouTube and on the band's Myspace.

Chart performance

References

2007 singles
Fightstar songs
Songs written by Charlie Simpson
Songs written by Alex Westaway
2007 songs
Alternative metal songs
Nu metal songs